Tom Ford (born 17 August 1983) is an English professional snooker player from the Midlands. Ford reached the final of the 2016 Paul Hunter Classic, before losing the final 2–4 to Mark Selby. He also reached the semi-final of both the 2018 UK Championship and the 2019 English Open.

Ford has compiled five maximum breaks in competitive play, and over 200  breaks.

Career

Early years
As a junior, Ford played against Mark Selby frequently. He began his professional career by playing the Challenge Tour in 2001, at the time the second-level professional tour. His first quarter-final came at the 2005 Malta Cup where he beat Ken Doherty, but eventually lost to Stephen Hendry.
In the 2007 Grand Prix, he made a 147 against Steve Davis, after having just come out of hospital suffering from gastroenteritis, but still missed out on the last 16, eventually finishing 3rd in his group. He secured the high break and maximum prize, but it was not televised. In the last 32 of the 2007 Northern Ireland Trophy he held Ronnie O'Sullivan to 4–4, before missing the final blue, allowing O'Sullivan to clinch the frame. Ford made his World Championship debut in 2010, after beating Judd Trump 10–3 in the final qualifying round. He played Mark Allen in the first round, where he lost 4–10.

2010/2011
Early in the season Ford won his first professional title, Event 3 of the Players Tour Championship, beating Jack Lisowski 4–0 in the final while working with sports mentor Matt Andrews. Ford failed to qualify for the main draws of both the Shanghai Masters and the World Open, but did beat Tony Drago and Gerard Greene to reach the Last 32 of the UK Championship. He was drawn against Mark Allen and lost 5–9. Ford did not qualify for the final stages of any other ranking event for the season after losing 8–10 to Liu Chuang in Round 4 of qualifying for the World Championship.

2011/2012
The first world ranking event of the season was the inaugural Australian Goldfields Open, where Ford reached the final stages by beating Gerard Greene. He then beat world number 15 Jamie Cope 5–3 before being whitewashed 0–5 by eventual winner Stuart Bingham in the last 16. He made it through to his third successive UK Championship main draw where he played former world champion Neil Robertson, but was comfortably beaten 1–6. Ford won his second PTC title at Event 11 in December by defeating Martin Gould 4–3. He finished twelfth in the Order of Merit to qualify for the 2012 Finals, where he lost to Mark Davis 1–4 in the last 24. He then qualified for the wildcard round of the German Masters with a 5–0 whitewash of Anthony Hamilton and beat Irishman Philip Arnold 5–1 to reach the last 32, where he met Mark Allen. Ford held a 3–0 lead, but went on to lose the match 4–5. He qualified for the Welsh Open and beat Graeme Dott 4–2 in the opening round, before losing to Stephen Lee 1–4. Ford also reached the second round of the World Open, thanks to the withdrawal of Ronnie O'Sullivan, but exited the tournament in a final frame decider versus Mark King. He then lost to Lee again, this time in the first round of the China Open, before failing to qualify for the World Championship after being edged out 9–10 by Cao Yupeng. Ford finished the season ranked world number 26, meaning he had risen eight places during the year.

2012/2013
Ford qualified for six ranking events during the 2012–13 season. Out of those he lost in the first round in three and in the second round of both the Australian Goldfields Open and Welsh Open to Shaun Murphy 1–5 and Ken Doherty 3–4 respectively. He couldn't qualify for the Players Tour Championship Finals through the Order of Merit as he finished 46th, but he did play in all three of the new Asian PTC's. His best result came in the Third Event, where he lost 3–4 in the semi-finals to Stuart Bingham. Ford finished sixth on the Asian Order of Merit, inside the top eight who qualified for the Finals. It was at the Finals that Ford had his best run in a ranking event of his career. He saw off Martin Gould 4–2, Jack Lisowski 4–3 and Marco Fu 4–1 to advance to the semi-finals. His nerves showed early on against Neil Robertson as he fell 0–3 down, but composed himself to level at 3–3. Ford had three chances to win the deciding frame, but left Robertson a chance when escaping a snooker to lose 3–4. Ford ended the season ranked world number 24.

2013/2014
At the 2013 Australian Goldfields Open Ford reached the quarter-finals of a ranking event for the third time in his career by beating Ryan Day and Barry Hawkins, before losing 3–5 to Robert Milkins. He won through to the second round of both the Indian Open and Welsh Open but was eliminated by Stephen Maguire and James Wattana respectively. Ford defeated James Cahill 10–6, Luca Brecel 10–1 and Matthew Stevens 10–8 to qualify for the World Championship for the second time. He rallied from 6–2 down in the first round against Judd Trump to level at 8–8, before losing two successive frames to exit the tournament.

2014/2015
Ford qualified for the Australian Goldfields Open for the fourth year in a row and lost 3–5 to John Higgins in the first round. He had five defeats in a row after this until beating Barry Pinches 6–4 in the opening round of the UK Championship, his first win in the event after six prior losses. Ford was beaten 3–6 by Joel Walker in the second round. He had a resurgence of form at the Asian Tour event, the Xuzhou Open by knocking out five players to reach the semi-finals, where he lost the last two frames in a 3–4 defeat to Joe Perry. Ford entered the qualifying rounds of the World Championship needing wins to ensure his survival on the tour as he was close to ending the season outside the top 64 in the world rankings. He did so by seeing off Andrew Norman 10–2 and David Gilbert 10–8 to meet Matthew Selt in the final round, where he lost 8–10. Ford ended up 59th in the world rankings, a drop of 27 places during the year.

2015/2016
Ford began the 2015–16 season by reaching the third final carrying ranking points of his career after overcoming the likes of Joe Perry, Matthew Selt and Ben Woollaston at the Riga Open. Ford won the first frame against Barry Hawkins, but could not capture another to be beaten 1–4. At the UK Championship, he defeated Scott Donaldson 6–1 and then beat Mark Williams for the first time by recovering from 3–5 down to win 6–5. He followed that up by easing past Kyren Wilson 6–1, but accused his opponent Liang Wenbo of boring him off the table in the fourth round after it was Ford who lost 5–6 having been 5–3 up. Ford failed to build upon this during the rest of the season as he could not get beyond the second round of any ranking event. However, he was able to build on his world ranking to finish as the world number 43, an increase of 16 spots during the year.

2016/2017
A 4–1 victory over Jamie Jones at the Paul Hunter Classic saw Ford reach the second ranking event semi-final of his career and he beat Thepchaiya Un-Nooh 4–2, closing the match with a 136 break. In Ford's first ranking event final he was 2–2 with Mark Selby, before his fellow Leicester player knocked in two 50 plus breaks to defeat Ford 4–2. At the English Open he beat Rory McLeod, Marco Fu and Joe Swail all by 4–2 scorelines, before losing 1–4 to John Higgins. Ford qualified for the German Masters by ousting Judd Trump 5–1 and then made a 147 in a first round 5–2 win over Peter Ebdon. He saw off Mark King 5–2, but then lost 2–5 to Ali Carter in the quarter-finals. Ford qualified for his third World Championship courtesy of victories over Jamie Bodle, Chris Wakelin and Hossein Vafaei. From holding a narrow 2–1 advantage over Barry Hawkins in the first round, Ford was eliminated 3–10.

2017/2018

2018/2019

2019/2020

Performance and rankings timeline

Career finals

Ranking finals: 2

Minor-ranking finals: 3 (2 titles)

Non-ranking finals: 2

Pro-am finals: 1 (1 title)

References

External links

Tom Ford at worldsnooker.com

English snooker players
People from Blaby District
Sportspeople from Leicestershire
Living people
1983 births